Just in Time is a 1997 American romantic comedy-drama film directed by Shawn Levy from a screenplay by Eric Tuchman. This was the second feature film directed by Levy, who went on to direct Night at the Museum (2006) and Date Night (2010).

Cast
 Mark Moses as Michael Bedford
 Rebecca Chambers as Faith Zacarelli
 Jane Sibbett as Brenda Hyatt
 Steven Eckholdt as Jake Bedford
 Brittany Alyse Smith as Lily Bedford
 Micole Mercurio as Dotty Zacarelli
 Scott Ditty as Richie
 Rosalind Soulam as Roberta
 Frank Gerrish as Big Frank
 Dennis Saylor as Jerry
 Micaela Nelligan as Mrs. Thaler
 Jeff Olson as Hal Pipkin
 Shawn Levy as Photographer

References

External links 

Just in Time trailer at The Trailers Bay

1997 films
1997 romantic comedy-drama films
American romantic comedy-drama films
Films directed by Shawn Levy
1997 comedy films
1997 drama films
1990s English-language films
1990s American films